Defending champion Lleyton Hewitt defeated Gustavo Kuerten in the final, 6–1, 6–1 to win the men's singles tennis title at the 2003 Indian Wells Masters.

Seeds

Draw

Finals

Top half

Section 1

Section 2

Bottom half

Section 3

Section 4

References
 2003 Pacific Life Open draw

Men's Singles